The 4th Lambda Literary Awards were held in 1992 to honour works of LGBT literature published in 1991.

Special awards

Nominees and winners

External links
 4th Lambda Literary Awards

04
Lambda
Lists of LGBT-related award winners and nominees
1992 in LGBT history
1992 awards in the United States